The Woman's Building was designed and built for the World's Columbian Exposition held in Chicago in 1893 under the auspices of the Board of Lady Managers. Of the twelve main buildings for the Exhibition, on June 30, 1892 The Woman's Building was the first to be completed. It had exhibition space as well as an assembly room, a library, and a Hall of Honor. The History of the World's Fair states, "It will be a long time before such an aggregation of woman's work, as may now be seen in the Woman's Building, can be gathered from all parts of the world again."

Building

Fourteen women architects submitted designs for the Woman's Building. The Board of Architects selected Sophia Hayden's design.  The design was for a three story building done in Italian Renaissance style with Corinthian columns. The Hall of Honor was in total 70 feet in height and didn't have any pillars or supports obstructing the space. Alice Rideout was chosen as the official sculptor for the Woman's Building. She created the exterior sculpture groups and the pediment. Enid Yandell designed and created the caryatid that supported the roof garden. Candace Wheeler supervised the interior decorations.

Decor
Interior decoration included murals painted by Mary Fairchild MacMonnies Low (Primitive Woman) and Mary Cassatt (Modern Woman).  Cassatt was asked to paint a 58 x 12 foot mural for the north tympanum over the entrance to the Gallery of Honor, showcasing the advancement of women throughout history, called Modern Woman.  Four panels in the Hall of Honor were painted by Lucia Fairchild Fuller, Amanda Brewster Sewell, Rosina Emmet Sherwood and Lydia Field Emmet. The work by Rosina Emmet Sherwood, titled The Republic's Welcome to Her Daughters, is a neo-classical setting with women draped in a toga bestowing women entering the hall with laurels as crowns. Women in Arcadia, painted by Amanda Brewster Sewell, displays a warm summer with two women, one of which is half nude holding their hand out to a sheep and the other stands behind her plucking oranges from a tree. The library ceiling mural was painted by Dora Wheeler Keith. Regardless of the artists background, they all painted their murals in the 'new style' which had been developed in France.

The British sculptor Ellen Mary Rope contributed a bas-relief, depicting ‘Hope, Charity, Faith and Heavenly Wisdom’, which found a later home in the dining room of the first Ladies' Residential Chambers in London, a project of cousins Rhoda and Agnes Garrett.

Located in the Assembly Hall were seven stained and leaded glass windows that were visible from both the inside as well as out. The most prominent of which was centered behind the stage. Created by Elisabeth Parsons, Edith Blake Brown, and Ethel Isadore Brown, Massachusetts Mothering the Coming Woman of Liberty, Progress, and Light depicts two women both in classical garb, the one in the forefront holds a torch high above her head.

Exhibits
The Woman's Building contained exhibits of works by women across a variety of fields from fine art, applied art, literature and music, to science, and home economics. There were also exhibits about women in American history and other cultures and places in the world. Displays also included charts and graphs of women's advancement in the industrial workforce as well as philanthropic and political work. The Smithsonian loaned an ethnological exhibit featuring crafts from several cultures including African, Native American, and Polynesian, titled "Woman's Work in Savagery". The Inventions Room and Science Exhibit featured more modern contributions, all of which except for one were of white woman.

The library, located on the second floor and decorated with wood paneled bookshelves, leather couches, and artworks by female artists, boasted at least 8,000 books representing 24 different nations all of which were written by women.

Annexed to the Woman's Building was the Children's Building, which exhibited American 19th century best practices for child-rearing and education.

Legacy
Yandell co-wrote a semi-autobiographical account of her involvement in planning the fair, Three Girls in a Flat (1892).

The exhibits at the Woman's building inspired Danish noblewoman, Sophie Oxholm, to organize a women's exhibition in Copenhagen, eventually resulting in the 1895 Copenhagen Women's Exhibition.

Buildings at world's fairs are often demolished when the event ends, and finding another home for them is rarely practical. (The exception was The Crystal Palace after the Great Exhibition of 1851.) The Woman's Building was destroyed as part of the general demolition after the Fair. Sadly, after the exposition, Cassatt's mural and many other artworks by many women were placed in storage and subsequently lost.

Eighty years later, the Woman's Building had been almost lost to history. With the flourishing of second-wave feminism, women went searching for what had gone before. Feminist artist Judy Chicago and her team of students, in the midst of creating The Dinner Party, discovered a copy of the Woman's Building catalog in a second-hand bookstore. When the Los Angeles Woman's Building was opened in 1973, the founders decided to name the organization after the 1893 Woman's Building.

Gallery

See also
List of women artists exhibited at the 1893 World's Columbian Exposition
White Rabbits (sculptors), a group of women who created statues for the Horticultural Building
World's Congress of Representative Women, a week-long convention for the voicing of women's concerns, held at the Fair in May 1893
Women's Building (disambiguation), other structures with a similar name

References

External links
Digitized version of World's Columbian Exposition, 1893: Official catalogue: pt. XIV, woman's building by World's Columbian Exposition (1893 : Chicago, Ill.)
Digitized version of Art and Handicraft in the Woman's Building of the World's Columbian Exposition, Chicago, 1893
Scans of illustrations from 'Art and Handicraft in the Woman's Building of the World's Columbian Exposition, Chicago, 1893'
The Women's Pavilion by By Anna Burrows
The Book of the Fair:Chapter the Eleventh: Woman's Department
  Official manual of the Board of Lady Managers of the World's Columbian Commission : the minutes of the Board from the date of its organization, November 19, 1890, to the close of its second session, September 9, 1891, including the act of Congress and information in regard to the action of the World's Columbian Commission and of the Chicago directory of the Columbian Exposition, by World's Columbian Exposition (1891)

1890s architecture in the United States
1890s in Chicago
1893 in the United States
Woman's Building
Women and the arts
Architecture in Chicago
South Side, Chicago
Women in Illinois
History of women in the United States
Women's events
Women in Chicago